The 1945–46 season was Blackpool F.C.'s first season of post-World War II football. They competed in the 22-team Football League North, a stop-gap competition introduced between the end of inter-war football and the recommencement of the Football League proper the following season, finishing ninth. The statistics from this season are not included in official publications.

Blackpool won 18 games, drew 9 and lost 15 of their league games.

Stan Mortensen was the club's top scorer for the second consecutive season, with 38 goals (34 in the league and four in the FA Cup).

League table

Notes

References

Blackpool F.C.
Blackpool F.C. seasons